São Paulo Sevens is an annual women's Rugby sevens tournament, and one of five stops on the IRB Women's Sevens World Series. São Paulo joined in the second year of the Series.

Cup winners

2014 

The 2014 edition of the tournament took place at Arena Barueri, São Paulo on 21–22 February 2014. A total of twelve teams competed: The eight "core" teams, and four invited teams.

Core Teams

Invited Teams

2015 

The 2015 edition of the tournament took place at Arena Barueri, São Paulo on 7–8 February 2015. A total of twelve teams competed:

2016

The 2016 edition of the tournament took place at Arena Barueri, São Paulo on 20–21 February 2015. A total of twelve teams competed:

References

 
World Rugby Women's Sevens Series tournaments
International rugby union competitions hosted by Brazil
Rugby sevens competitions in South America
Rugby sevens competitions in Brazil
2014 establishments in Brazil
Recurring sporting events established in 2014